Benjamin Adam Samit (born July 21, 1984) is an American film and television writer and producer who is most notable for writing Detective Pikachu, which he wrote with his writing partner, Dan Hernandez (along with Rob Letterman, Derek Connolly and Nicole Perlman). On television, Samit and Hernandez have written for One Day at a Time, The Tick, Super Fun Night and 1600 Penn. They were named in Paste Magazine's list of the top 28 comedy writers of 2018. In 2019, Samit and Hernandez signed a long-term deal with 20th Century Fox Television to develop, write and produce live-action and animated series.

Filmography

Film

Television

References

External links

American television writers
Living people
American producers
1984 births